The red-rumped tinkerbird (Pogoniulus atroflavus) is a species of bird in the Lybiidae family (African barbets).
It is widely spread across the African tropical rainforest.

References

red-rumped tinkerbird
Birds of the African tropical rainforest
red-rumped tinkerbird
Taxonomy articles created by Polbot